The 2008 Cape Verdean Football Championships season was the 29th of the competition of the first-tier football in Cape Verde. Its started on 10 May and finished on 16 August, later than the last season. The tournament was organized by the Cape Verdean Football Federation. Sporting would win their 7th title and third straight after defeating Académica do Mindelo in penalty kicks. Sporting gained entry into the 2009 CAF Champions League, it is the last club to enter to date. No second place club would participate in the 2009 CAF Confederation Cup.

Overview 
Sporting Clube da Praia was the defending team of the title. A total of 12 clubs participated in the competition, one from each island league and one who won the last season's title. As Sporting Praia won the 2007 national title, Académica da Praia, runner-up of the island division would compete in the championships.

The season at the time made Sporting Praia to be the first club to win three back-to-back titles. It was the only club that got three titles until 2015 when CS Mindelense became the second club to win three back-to-back titles in 2015.

The biggest win were AD Bairro and Sporting Praia who scored 6 each match, Bairro against Fiorentina and Sporting Praia against Corôa. Two matches which one team scored the highest point and the season was not the retelling of high scoring records. Derby won all five matches in any of the group stages, the first since two teams were added in 2003, it was the only club to do so until 2012. Derby won the most matches at the national championships and remains one of the records as of 2016.

There were no competitions on the third week of May (May 17 & 18) due to the 2008 local elections.

Platini played his last match for Sporting Praia and a Cape Verdean team on the second leg of the finals before moving to Académica de Coimbra in Portugal in the following season.

The semifinals were originally scheduled for July 5 to 11, as an ineligible player was fielded, they were rescheduled to July 26 and August 2 and the finals on August 9 and 16. It interrupted the 2nd Cape Verdean Cup which was to take place in August, it was indeed cancelled, the second edition of the cup took place in the following year.

The next such rescheduling was in 2017 between Ultramarina Tarrafal of São Nicolau and Mindelo's Mindelense of São Vicente as Estádio Orlando Rodrigues had no extra keys for opening its doors so players can play a first leg match along with the personnel.

Participating clubs 

 Sporting Clube da Praia, winner of the 2007 Cape Verdean Football Championships
 SC Sal Rei, winner of the Boa Vista Island League
 GD Corôa, winner of the Brava Island League
 Académica (Fogo), winner of the Fogo Island League
 Académica da Calheta, winner of the Maio Island League
 Académico do Aeroporto, winner of the Sal Island League
 Scorpion Vermelho, winner of the Santiago Island League (North)
 Associação Desportiva do Bairro, runner-up of the Santiago Island League (South)
 Solpontense, winner of the Santo Antão Island League (North)
 Grupo Desportivo, Recreativo e Cultural Fiorentina, winner of the Santo Antão Island League (South)
 Desportivo Ribeira Brava, winner of the São Nicolau Island League
 FC Derby, winner of the São Vicente Island League

Information about the clubs

League standings 
 Group A 

 Group B

Results

Final Stages

Semi-finals

Finals

Statistics 
 Top scorer: Fufuco: 9 goals (AD Bairro)
 Biggest win: Sporting Praia 6-0 Corôa (June 14)

See also 
 2007–08 in Cape Verdean football

Footnotes

External links 
 
 2008 Cape Verdean Football Championships at RSSSF

Cape Verdean Football Championship seasons
1
Cape